Avery Young (born November 12, 1992) is an American football offensive tackle who is a free agent. He played college football at Auburn, and was signed by the New Orleans Saints as an undrafted free agent in 2016. He is also the younger brother of former defensive end Willie Young.

College career
At Auburn University, Young was a three-year starter at both tackle and guard and served as the starting right tackle during his senior year.

Professional career

New Orleans Saints
Young signed with the New Orleans Saints as an undrafted free agent on May 2, 2016. He suffered a knee injury at his Pro Day and spent his entire rookie season on the Saints' non-football injury list. On February 27, 2017, Young was released by the Saints.

Miami Dolphins
On March 21, 2017, Young signed with the Miami Dolphins. He was waived on September 2, 2017.

Tampa Bay Buccaneers
On December 20, 2017, Young was signed to the Tampa Bay Buccaneers' practice squad. He signed a reserve/future contract with the Buccaneers on January 3, 2018. He was waived on April 30, 2018.

Seattle Seahawks
On May 7, 2018, Young signed with the Seattle Seahawks. He was waived/injured on August 1, 2018 and placed on injured reserve. He was released on August 14, 2018.

Birmingham Iron
In 2019, Young joined the Birmingham Iron of the Alliance of American Football.

Hamilton Tiger-Cats
After the AAF ceased operations in April 2019, Young signed with the Hamilton Tiger-Cats of the Canadian Football League.

St. Louis BattleHawks
In October 2019, Young was picked by the St. Louis BattleHawks in the open phase of the 2020 XFL Draft.

New York Guardians
On January 17, 2020, Young was traded to the New York Guardians, along with offensive lineman Dejon Allen, in exchange for cornerback David Rivers and offensive lineman Brian Wallace. He had his contract terminated when the league suspended operations on April 10, 2020.

The Spring League
Young was selected by the Conquerors of The Spring League during its player selection draft on October 11, 2020. His contract was terminated when the league suspended operations in 2021.

Vegas Vipers
Young was selected by the Vegas Vipers in the 2023 XFL Draft.

References

External links
Auburn Tigers bio

Living people
1992 births
Auburn Tigers football players
Birmingham Iron players
Hamilton Tiger-Cats players
Miami Dolphins players
New Orleans Saints players
New York Guardians players
People from Palm Beach Gardens, Florida
Players of American football from Florida
Seattle Seahawks players
St. Louis BattleHawks players
Sportspeople from the Miami metropolitan area
Tampa Bay Buccaneers players
The Spring League players
Vegas Vipers players